Arnold Coates (24 July 1936 – 25 February 2013) was an English leading amateur footballer active in the 1960s who played as a striker.

Career

Club career
Coates played amateur football with Evenwood Town and Crook Town, scoring two goals in the final as they won the FA Amateur Cup in April 1962. He was also in Crook's 1959 FA Amateur Cup winning team in his first spell at the club. He turned professional with Queen of the South in 1963, scoring 25 goals in 48 appearances in the Scottish Football League over the next two seasons. Coates later returned to non-League football with Scarborough, before joining village team Howden-le-Wear.

International career
Coates was called up to the Great Britain squad for the 1960 Summer Olympics, but did not make an appearance in the tournament. He also represented the England amateur team three times, in 1960 v West Germany and Scotland whilst an Evenwood player and in 1962 v France following his return to Crook. His only goal came against Scotland.

Later life
Coates moved to Nelson, Lancashire and worked in insurance.

References

1936 births
2013 deaths
English footballers
Spennymoor United F.C. players
Crook Town A.F.C. players
Queen of the South F.C. players
Scarborough F.C. players
Scottish Football League players
Footballers at the 1960 Summer Olympics
Olympic footballers of Great Britain
Association football forwards